This is a list of German language place names in Poland, now exonyms for towns and villages in the Pomeranian Voivodeship.

Bałdowo Baldau
Bargędzino Bergensin
Bobowo Bobau; Dietersfelde (1939-1942)
Borzytuchom Borntuchen
Brusy Bruß
Bytów Bütow
Cedry Wielkie Groß Zünder
Cewice Zewitz
Chojnice Konitz
Choczewo Chottschow, Gotendorf (1938-1945)
Czarna Dąbrówka Schwarze Damerkow
Czarna Woda Schwarzwasser
Czarne Hammerstein
Czersk Czersk; Heiderode (1942-1945)
Człuchów Schlochau
Damnica Hebrondamnitz
Dębnica Kaszubska Rathsdamnitz
Debrzno Preußisch Friedland
Dziemiany Dzimianen
Dzierzgoń Christburg
Gardeja Garnsee
Gdańsk Danzig
Gdynia Gdingen, 1939-1945 Gotenhafen
Główczyce Glowitz
Gniew Mewe
Gniewino Gnewin
Gorzędziej Gerdin
Grabowska Huta Grabaushütte
Hel Hela
Jastarnia Heisternest
Kaliska Dreidorf
Karsin Karschin, Karßin (1939-1945)
Kartuzy Karthaus
Kępice Hammermühle
Knybawa Kniebau
Kobylnica Kublitz, Königlich Kublitz
Koczała Flötenstein
Kolbudy Ober Kahlbude
Kołczygłowy Alt Kolziglow
Konarzyny Groß Konarczyn
Kosakowo Kossakau
Kościerzyna Berent
Krokowa Krockow
Krynica Morska Kahlberg
Kwidzyn Marienwerder
Łeba Leba
Lębork Lauenburg
Łęczyce Lanz
Lichnowy Groß Lichtenau
Linia Linde
Liniewo Lienfelde
Lipnica Liepnitz
Lipusz Lippusch
Lubichowo Liebichau
Luzino Lusin, Freienau (1942-1943), Lintzau (1943-1945)
Malbork Marienburg
Miastko Rummelsburg
Mikołajki Pomorskie Niklaskirchen
Miłoradz Mielenz
Nowa Karczma Neukrug
Nowa Wieś Lęborska Neuendorf
Nowy Dwór Gdański Tiegenhof
Nowy Staw Neuteich
Osieczna Hagenort
Osiek Ossiek
Ostaszewo Schöneberg
Parchowo Parchau
Potęgowo Pottangow
Pruszcz Gdański Praust
Puck Putzig
Prabuty Riesenburg
Przechlewo Prechlau
Przodkowo Seefeld
Przywidz Mariensee
Pszczółki Hohenstein
Reda Rheda
Rozewie Rixhöft
Rumia Rahmel
Ryjewo Rehhof
Rzeczenica Stegers
Sadlinki Sedlinen
Siedlce, Gdańsk Schidlitz
Sierakowice Sierakowitz; Rockwitz; Sierke
Skarszewy Schöneck in Westpreußen
Skórcz Skurz
Słupsk Stolp
Smętowo Graniczne Schmentau
Smołdzino Schmolsin
Somonino Somlin
Sopot Zoppot
Stara Kiszewa Alt Kischau
Stare Pole Altfelde
Starogard Gdański Preußisch Stargard
Stary Dzierzgoń Alt Christburg
Stary Targ Altmark in Westpreußen
Stegna Steegen
Stężyca Königlich Stendsitz
Studzienice Stüdnitz
Suchy Dąb Zugdam
Sulęczyno Sullenschin
Szemud Schönwalde
Sztum Stuhm
Sztutowo Stutthof
Tczew Dirschau
Tczewskie Łąki Dirschauerwiesen
Trąbki Wielkie Ober Kahlbude
Trzebielino Treblin
Tuchomie Groß Tuchen
Udorpie Hygendorf
Ustka Stolpmünde
Wejherowo Neustadt im Westpreußen
Wicko Vietzig
Władysławowo Großendorf
Zblewo Hochstüblau
Żarnowiec Zarnowitz
Żukowo Zuckau

See also 
List of German exonyms for places in Poland

 G
Pomerania